This list of autoimmune diseases is categorized by organ and tissue type to help locate diseases that may be similar.

Autoimmune diseases qualifiers 
Overview of the qualifiers for the list.

Autoimmune diseases

Major organs

Glands

Digestive system

Tissue

Autoimmune comorbidities
This list includes conditions that are not diseases but signs common to autoimmune disease. Some, such as chronic fatigue syndrome, are controversial. These conditions are included here because they are frequently listed as autoimmune diseases but should not be included in the list above until there is more consistent evidence.

Non-autoimmune 
At this time, there is not sufficient evidence—direct, indirect, or circumstantial—to indicate that these diseases are caused by autoimmunity. These conditions are included here because:

 The disease was listed in the prior version of this table
 The disease is included in several widely used lists of autoimmune disease and is shown here to ensure that a person visiting this page does not conclude that the disease was not considered. Before moving a condition from here to the list of autoimmune diseases, references should be provided in the Wikipedia page for the condition that point to evidence, direct or indirect, that it is an autoimmune disease.

See also
 Autoimmune Autonomic Ganglionopathy (AAG)

References

Autoimmune diseases
Autoimmune
Autoimmune